Major General Aidarous Qassem Abdulaziz Al-Zubaidi (Arabic: عَيْدَرُوْس قاسم عبد العزيز الزُّبَيْدي) is the  Vice President within the Yemen Presidential Leadership Council (PLC)  and president of the Southern Transitional Council and the de facto leader of the Southern Movement in Yemen. He previously served as the governor of Aden Governorate from December 2015 to April 2017. Al-Zoubadi's intention was to bring liberation to Yemen's southern provinces extending from Aden to Hadhramaut Governorate.

Biography
Al-Zoubaidi is a former military commander from Dhale Governorate who remained loyal to President Abdrabbuh Mansour Hadi during the Yemeni Civil War. He was appointed as Governor of Aden in early December 2015, after the previous governor, Major General Jaafar Mohammed Saad, was assassinated in a car bombing. In early January 2016, he survived an assassination attempt by ISIL when a bomb exploded near his convoy, and at least one bodyguard was killed. He was fired on 27 April 2017 by President Hadi. On May 3, major rallies were held in Aden to protest the decision of Hadi.

One week later, the Southern Transitional Council (STC) was formed; some of the members were the governors of Dhale Governorate, Shabwah Governorate, Hadramaut Governorate, Lahij Governorate, Socotra, and Al Mahrah Governorate. Al-Zoubaidi became a member of the Southern Movement and President of the Southern Transitional Council.

On 29 January 2018, in the Battle of Aden, al-Zoubaidi announced a state of emergency in Aden and that "the STC has begun the process of overthrowing Hadi’s rule over the South". In April 2020, the STC announced self-rule in southern Yemen.

See also
Security Belt
South Yemen Insurgency
Yemeni Socialist Party

References

Living people
Governors of Aden
Yemeni military personnel  of the Yemeni Civil War (2014–present)
Yemeni politicians
People from Dhale Governorate
1967 births
South Yemen independence activists
Presidential Leadership Council
21st-century Yemeni politicians